The Lungkha (Luŋxa) is a river in Yakutia (Sakha Republic), Russia. It is the 14th longest tributary of the Lena with a length of  — counting its Yychaky tributary.

A331 highway passes close to the river near its origin. The villages of Oyun-Unguokhtakh, Argas and Taas-Tumus are located by the river. The last  stretch of the Lungkha is navigable.

Course  
The Lungkha is a left tributary of the Lena. It is formed at the confluence of the Yychaky and Yulagir rivers in the northern part of the Lena Plateau. It flows in a roughly northeastern direction roughly parallel to the Tyugyuene to the east. In its middle course it descends into the Central Yakutian Lowland where it meanders within a wide floodplain parallel to the lower course of the Vilyuy further north. The river basin is fed by rain and snow. Floods are common in the summer period.

Tributaries
The largest tributaries of the Lungkha are the Tohoron and Khatyng-Yurekh, both from the right. The river freezes between October and May.

Flora and fauna
The vegetation of the Lungkha basin is marked by middle taiga landscape. The snow cover in the river basin lasts an average of 220 days yearly.

The main fish species in the river are pike, ide and perch.

See also
List of rivers of Russia

References

External links 
Fishing & Tourism in Yakutia

Rivers of the Sakha Republic
Central Yakutian Lowland